Walter A. Wheeler, Sr. (November 13, 1925 – February 14, 2017) was an American politician and World War II veteran from Maine. A Democrat from Kittery, Maine, Wheeler served four terms in the Maine House of Representatives from 2002 to 2010. He served in the United States Navy 1943 – 1946 during World War II in the Pacific, Atlantic and European theaters. He was born in Manchester, Maine and died in Kittery, Maine on February 14, 2017, at the age of 91.

References

1925 births
2017 deaths
United States Navy personnel of World War II
Democratic Party members of the Maine House of Representatives
People from Kittery, Maine
People from Manchester, Maine
United States Navy sailors